Compañía Arrendataria del Monopolio del Petróleo, S.A. (Campsa) was the state-owned petroleum products company of Spain. Created in the 1920s during General Primo de Rivera's dictatorship, it was dissolved in 1992 owing to the demands of the European Union.  Its assets were distributed to the largest private petroleum companies in the Spanish market at the time, which were mainly Repsol, Cepsa and BP.  The rights to the Campsa brand were given to Repsol.

The remaining assets of the company, primarily focused on logistics and pipeline services but also its historical archives, were incorporated under the name Compañía Logística de Hidrocaburos, S.A. (CLH). Following a 2008 agreement between CLH and the National Energy Commission the latter took over the archives.

History 
The Compañía arrendataria del monopolio del petróleo (C.A.M.P.S.A.) was created on 24 June 1927 by a consortium of Spanish banks: Banco Urquijo, Banco Hispano-Americano, Banco Español de Crédito, Banco Herrero, Banco de Vizcaya, Banco de Bilbao, Banco de Cataluña, Banco Hispano Colonial and Banca Marsans.

References 

Non-renewable resource companies established in 1927
Non-renewable resource companies disestablished in 1992
Companies based in the Community of Madrid
Oil companies of Spain
Defunct oil companies
1992 disestablishments in Spain
Automotive fuel retailers
Spanish companies established in 1927
Defunct energy companies of Spain